Ellis Park may refer to:

 Ellis Park, Adelaide Park Lands in South Australia
 Ellis Park Arena (formerly Standard Bank Arena), an indoor stadium in Johannesburg, South Africa
 Ellis Park Stadium, also known as Emirates Airline Park, a stadium in Johannesburg, South Africa
 Ellis Park Race Course, a thoroughbred horse race track in Henderson, Kentucky